Comali is a 2019 Indian Tamil-language comedy drama film produced by Ishari K. Ganesh and written and directed by Pradeep Ranganathan in his directorial debut. The film stars Jayam Ravi, Kajal Aggarwal, Yogi Babu, Samyuktha Hegde and K. S. Ravikumar. The film marks the first collaboration between Ravi and Aggarwal, and the second collaboration between Ravi and Hiphop Tamizha, after the 2015 film Thani Oruvan. In the film, a coma patient who has missed 16 years of his life, struggles to adapt to the new improved world. 

The film was released on 15 August 2019 coinciding with Indian Independence Day and opened to mostly positive reviews from critics, and became commercially successful by grossing 50 crore at the box office.

Plot 

The year is 2000. Ravi is a school student whose father brought him up with many morals, like treating everyone fairly. He loves his classmate Nikitha and tried proposing her but at that precise moment, a goon Dharmaraj takes Nikitha as a human shield while escaping after killing a rival gangster Gaaja. Ravi gets hit by a truck and hits his head on the grill of a car while trying to save Nikitha and ends up comatose. 

16 years later, in 2017, Ravi awakes and sees his friend Mani and gets to know that his father died and his sister married Mani who has taken care of him all these years and incurred significant debts. Thiyagesh, the doctor who treated Ravi, tells Mani to fulfil  Ravi's wishes since he has missed 16 years of his life and so otherwise has every chance to fall into depression and he could try to kill himself or someone around. Fulfilling Ravi's first wish, Mani takes Ravi to Nikitha's house, only to realize that she is married and her husband is Thiyagesh. Nikitha, not wanting to embarrass her husband, lies that she did not like Ravi and would have rejected his proposal that day. Mani tries to cheer up Ravi by helping him find a girl in a matrimony website. 

Ravi takes an instant liking to Rithika, whom he saw in the website and  during his nephew's birthday party. She is friend of Mani's wife  . After some talking over phone, Rithika takes a liking to Ravi, and agrees to meet him for a date. Still an innocent teenager at heart, Ravi mistakes Rithika's air kiss while taking a selfie as her consent to kiss and kisses her. Rithika, not expecting this, slaps him in the middle of the road. This gets blown out of proportion by the public and media. Ravi's sister berates him for causing them more problems in addition to their debt problem. 

Unable to obtain a well-paying job since he never graduated, Ravi becomes a security guard at the museum where Rithika works. She tells him that she has forgiven him after knowing his innocence. After thwarting a robbery at the museum, Ravi sees a statue at the museum that he modified to gift Nikitha and realises that it belongs to his family which is revealed to be a royal one. However, it is revealed that Dharmaraj, now an MLA, currently owns the statue and lies that he is the  royal heir, using the statue as proof.

Meanwhile, Ravi also tries to familiarise himself with society and uses YouTube, where his reactions to modern society make him popular. As his fan following increases, Ravi devises a plan to prove that the statue belobgs to him and not Dharmaraj. With help from Rithika and Mani, he gets a button camera to livestream his conversation with Dharmaraj. Ravi's plan goes well, until a sweat droplet short circuits the electronic circuit, spoiling the whole plan. Left with no other means to prove his ownership of the statue, Ravi suddenly gets reminded of a group photo taken by Nikitha during his school days and tries to retrieve it from Nikitha. However, Thiyagesh accidentally destroys the photo negative, erasing any proof. 

Disappointed but determined, Ravi thinks  another plan. With the help of Nikitha, Thiyagesh, and rest of his crew has decided to defeat Dharmaraj without using technology, instead using human emotions, after Ravi explains that people are over-dependent of technology and are getting addicted to it. He says that they are losing their reality by living in the virtual world. Ravi plans to get inside Dharmaraj's house posing as a distant relative while using Thiyagesh as a scout. Ravi, Mani, and Nikitha go to Dharmaraj's house and distract Dharmaraj's pregnant wife, while Ravi tries to steal the statue and replace it with a duplicate. However, he is caught red-handed by Dharmaraj's wife, who attempts to inform her husband, but before she could communicate the matter to Dharmaraj, she slips and goes into labour. 

Out of humanitarian consideration, Ravi helps her to get to the hospital. En route, Ravi's auto gets stuck in flood due to heavy downpour, so he carries Dharmaraj's wife to the hospital with people on the street helping them. Ravi realises that humanity still exists despite all the changes in society. Dharmaraj hears about his wife and rushes to the hospital. After learning that Ravi helped his wife and that their child is born safely, he thanks Ravi and doesn't retaliate. Ravi learns his emotional outburst at Nikitha's house was filmed by Rithika and has gone viral across social media, earning him money to pay off Mani's debts. He does not sell the statue, but retains it as a family heirloom and continues making YouTube videos on social issues. In the end, all debts have been repaid, and Rithika and Ravi are together.

Cast

Production 
Pradeep Ranganathan had initially signed up to direct the film for Ishari K. Ganesh under the Prabhu Deva Studios banner, before Ganesh switched over to Vels Films International. Prabhu Deva initially agreed to play the lead role before he later opted out of the project.

Jayam Ravi lost  for the film, which was shot in Chennai, Tamil Nadu, on a specially erected school set. Bollywood and Kannada actress Kavita Radheshyam was brought in to play a role. Hiphop Tamizha agreed to compose the film's music, while Richard M. Nathan and  Pradeep E. Ragav were selected as cinematographer and editor respectively. Halfway through the production of Ishari K. Ganesh's venture Puppy, Varun was signed to play a supporting role in this film.

Plagiarism allegations 
Aspiring film director Krishnamoorthy accused the film producers of plagiarising his script, 25+25=25, which, too, was about a man who wakes up from a coma. Krishnamoorthy had registered his script with the South Indian Film Writers Association (SIFWA) in 2014 and pitched the script to several sources, including script agents, whom he speculated might have caused its leak. SIFWA compared Krishnamoorthy's script with Comali and determined that it was the same story. Krishnamoorthy said, "A twelve-member body in the Writers' Union, headed by a renowned director like Bhagyaraj, would not have decided in my favour if they thought only the premise of both stories were the same." To settle the matter, the Comali producers agreed to add a card before the film that would credit Krishnamoorthy as the source of the story. However, Pradeep Ranganathan denied plagiarising the script, saying, "The story of a man waking up from coma after years has been used time and again...". He also included a succeeding card mocking the previous card. "We both could have come up with the same idea. The script of Comali is something I had conceptualised even during my short film days."

Release and reception 
The film was released on 15 August 2019 coinciding with Indian Independence Day.

The film received mostly positive reviews from critics and audiences.The critics praised Ravi's acting who distinctly portrayed the role of a 16-year-old school student and a 32-year-old comatose survivor. They praised the comical duo of the lead and Yogi Babu in the first half but criticised the melodrama in the second half of the film. The Times of India rated 2.5/5, stating that "An entertaining first half didn't have an equally engaging latter half because of some melodramatic scenes." Behindwoods rated 3/5,stating that "Jayam Ravi and Yogi Babu's chemistry bolsters Comali, an entertaining film with a good mix of fun and emotions." Sify rated 3/5,stating that "The first half of Comali is super engaging, the second half goes in various directions and moves away from the core theme. The climax looks forced although the message on humanity stays relevant." Firstpost rated 3/5, stating that "Comali is packaged as a jolly-feel-good entertainer, laced with emotions and nostalgia." Baradwaj Rangan of Film Companion South wrote "It's hard to classify the severely underwhelming Comali because the director himself isn’t sure what he’s making".

Soundtrack 
The film's soundtrack is composed by Hiphop Tamizha, marking their second collaboration with Jayam Ravi after Thani Oruvan. Lyrics are written by Hiphop Tamizha, Kabilan Vairamuthu, Pradeep Ranganathan, Gana Kavi, and Mobin. Rahul Nambiar and Jayam Ravi, recorded one song for this film.

Potential remake 
Boney Kapoor has announced a remake of the film starring Arjun Kapoor in Hindi. Bayview Projects, his production company has acquired the remake rights of the film for all the languages including Hindi.

References

External links 
 

2010s Tamil-language films
2019 comedy-drama films
2019 directorial debut films
2019 films
Films involved in plagiarism controversies
Films scored by Hiphop Tamizha
Indian comedy-drama films
Indian slapstick comedy films